The Life and Letters of Charles Darwin is a book published in 1887 edited by Francis Darwin about his father Charles Darwin.  It contains a selection of 87 letters from the correspondence of Charles Darwin, an autobiographical chapter written by Charles Darwin for his family, and an essay by Thomas Huxley "On the reception of the 'Origin of Species'".

It was published by Darwin's publisher John Murray.

The autobiographical chapter had begun as recollections, written for his own amusement and for his descendants, initially as 121 pages written between May and August, 1876, and expanded during the remaining six years of his life. It was edited by Francis to remove references to his father's views on religion.  These were later reinstated and published as The Autobiography of Charles Darwin in 1958 by Charles's granddaughter (and Francis's niece) Nora Barlow.

The book was the first real biography of Charles Darwin, excepting obituaries, and thus the foundation of the Darwin Industry.

Further volumes of letters followed - More Letters of Charles Darwin in 1903.  Charles's wife Emma Darwin's correspondence was published by Charles and Emma's daughter (Frank's sister) Henrietta Litchfield in 1905/1915 as Emma Darwin: A Century of Family Letters.

The book received extensive reviews in The Times and The Manchester Guardian

The book was later described by The Times as "one of the best biographies ever written" and "In the selection and arrangement of the material he [Francis Darwin] was chiefly guided by a wish to portray his father's personal character, and he succeeded in a remarkable degree in giving a true picture of the man and the student, the methods of Darwin's work and the gradual development of his opinions."

Correspondents 

Letters to and/or from the following 27 men and one woman are included:

 Louis Agassiz
 H. W. Bates
  H. G. Bronn
 Alphonse Pyramus de Candolle
  W. B. Carpenter
 Emma Darwin (wife and cousin)
 Erasmus Alvey Darwin (brother)
 Thomas Davidson
  William Darwin Fox (cousin)
 Hugh Falconer
 Asa Gray
 J. S. Henslow
 Joseph Dalton Hooker
 Sir Henry Holland, 1st Baronet (cousin) 
 Thomas Henry Huxley
 Leonard Jenyns
  Charles Kingsley
  Charles Lyell
 John Lubbock, 1st Baron Avebury
 Maxwell Masters
 John Murray II
 Joseph Prestwich
 Rev. J. M. Rodwell
  Adam Sedgwick
 Herbert Spencer
 Alfred Russel Wallace
 Frederick Watkins
 H. C. Watson

References

External links 
 http://darwin-online.org.uk/EditorialIntroductions/Freeman_LifeandLettersandAutobiography.html

1887 non-fiction books
John Murray (publishing house) books
Books about Charles Darwin
Correspondences